The BL 6-inch gun Mark VII (and the related Mk VIII) was a British naval gun dating from 1899, which was mounted on a heavy travelling carriage in 1915 for British Army service to become one of the main heavy field guns in the First World War, and also served as one of the main coast defence guns throughout the British Empire until the 1950s.

Background 
BL Mk VII returned to loading charges in silk bags after it was determined that with new single-action breech mechanisms a six-inch BL gun could be loaded, a vent tube inserted and fired as quickly as a QF six inch gun. Cordite charges in silk bags stored for a BL gun were also considered to represent a considerable saving in weight and magazine space compared to the bulky brass QF cartridge cases.

Naval gun 

The Mk VIII in naval service was identical to the Mk VII, except that the breech opened to the left instead of to the right, for use as the left gun in twin turrets.

World War I field gun 
The Mk VII gun was first used as a field gun in France in 1915. It was initially mounted on an improvised rectangular-frame field carriage designed by Admiral Percy Scott. The carriage was based on a design he had improvised for the 4.7-inch gun in the Second Boer War. It was a successful carriage, except that it limited the elevation and hence the range. A better carriage which allowed elevation to 22°, the MK II, was introduced early in 1916. This was followed by Mk III, V and VI carriages. The gun was operated by the Royal Garrison Artillery in batteries of four, as were all the larger field guns in World War I.

Following a successful deployment in the Battle of the Somme, the role of the gun was defined as counter-battery fire. They "were most effective for neutralising defences and for wire cutting with fuze 106 (a new fuze which reliably burst instantly above ground on even slight contact, instead of forming craters)". They were also effective for long-range fire against "targets in depth". The Mk VII was superseded by the lighter and longer-range BL 6-inch Gun Mk XIX which was introduced from October 1916, but the Mk VII remained in service to the end of World War I.

Coast defence gun 
The 6-inch Mk VII gun, together with the 9.2-inch Mk X gun, provided the main coast defence throughout the British Empire, from the early 1900s until the abolition of coast artillery in the 1950s. Many guns were specially built for army coast defence use, and following the decommissioning of many obsolete cruisers and battleships after World War I, their 6-inch Mk VII guns were also recycled for coast defence. During World War I, 103 of these guns were in service in coastal defences around the UK. Some of these, together with others at ports around the wider British Empire, played an important defence role in World War II and remained in service until the 1950s.

A number of new similar guns with stronger barrels which allowed more powerful cordite charges to be used were manufactured for coast defence during World War II, and were designated 6-inch BL Mark XXIV.

Notable actions 
In the German raid on Scarborough, Hartlepool and Whitby on 16 December 1914, a notable action was fought by the Durham Royal Garrison Artillery of the Territorial Force at Heugh (two guns) and Lighthouse (one gun) batteries defending Hartlepool. The battlecruisers fired a total of 1,150 rounds at the town and the batteries causing 112 civilians and seven military killed.

World War I ammunition

See also 
 List of field guns
 List of naval guns

Weapons of comparable role, performance and era 
 15 cm L/40 Feldkanone i.R.: German naval gun deployed as field gun in World War I
 6-inch/50-caliber gun – contemporary US Navy weapon, used on ships circa 1900 and as coast defence in World War II
 6-inch gun M1897 – contemporary US Army coast defence weapon, used as a field gun in World War I

Surviving examples 

 At the Royal Artillery Museum Woolwich, London.
 A coast defence gun at Newhaven Fort, Sussex, UK
 A gun mounted on the 1904 coast defence emplacement at New Tavern Fort, Gravesend, UK
 2 coast defence Mk 7 guns at Fort Dunree, Lough Swilly, in County Donegal, Ireland
 St. David's Battery, St. David's Head, St. David's Island, Bermuda. Two Mk VII RBLs, built by Vickers, on Central Pivot Mk II mounts.
 Fort Scratchley, Newcastle, New South Wales, Australia. 2 guns dating from 1911. Decommissioned in 1965 and placed in a nearby park. Moved back to their original mounts in 1978 after the Fort became a museum. Both were restored in 1992 by the Fort Scratchley Historical Society and are capable of being fired on special occasions for ceremonial and saluting purposes.
 Fort St. Catherine's, St. George's Island, Bermuda 6-inch BL Gun Mk VII Gun, built by Vickers, on Central Pivot Mk II mount.
 Warwick Camp, Warwick, Bermuda. Two Mk. VII, built by Vickers, on Central Pivot Mk II mounts. (This is an active military base, and the battery is not accessible by the public. The barrels have reportedly been removed, recently, for remounting on the bastions of the Keep, at the Royal Naval Dockyard, on Ireland Island, which houses the Bermuda Maritime Museum.
 Royal Naval Dockyard, Ireland Island, Bermuda. Two Mk VII (L/1029 and RGF) on Central Pivot Mk II, at Bastions C and D of the Keep (fortress) which houses the Bermuda Maritime Museum (there is also one BL 6-inch Gun Mk II and one BL 6-inch gun Mk IV, at Bastion E).
 A gun on field carriage at The Front Museum, Lappohja, Finland
 Fort Ogilvie, Point Pleasant Park, Halifax, Nova Scotia
 VSM gun No. 1553 dated 1901 at Princess Royal Fortress, Albany, Western Australia. Obtained from Bermuda during restoration of the site in the 1980s.
 Barrel 1489 which fired the first Australian shot of WWI, and 1317 which fired the first Australian shot of WWII at Fort Nepean, Victoria
 Mk VII gun dated 1902 at Ile aux Aigrettes, Mauritius
  Momi, Vuda, Batteries, Viti Levu, Fiji Islands. One of the barrels is #1266 from 1900
 Fort Mitchell, Spike Island, Ireland, 2 Mk VII Guns in casemates on Central Pivot Mk II mounts in good condition and in the process of being restored to full working condition.
 Lonehort Fort, Bere Island, County Cork, Ireland- Two 6-inch BL guns are extant- Breech blocks are missing and the guns themselves somewhat rusty, but otherwise appear to be in good condition. The fort was open to the public on 14 and 15 March 2014 for an underground art experience titled "Nest", which took place in the shell rooms below the guns. The shell rooms and hoists are also in good condition.
 Coastal Artillery Battery at Outão, Portugal on the mouth of Sado river, protecting Setubal harbour with 3 guns decommissioned in 1998
 Three Mk VII (dating 1904, 1914 and 1918) of the Ostenburg battery at the Royal Naval Dockyard, Trincomalee.
 Three Mk VII of the Modara battery at the Rock House Army Camp.
 Two Mk VII at Banana, on the Atlantic coast of the Democratic Republic of the Congo. They are out of use since 1960.
 One Mk VII taken from Singapore and moved to Tinian as part of a battery of three such weapons, now sits outside the Tinian International airport. This gun fired on the battleship  and destroyer , on 24 July 1944, causing extensive casualties and damage to both vessels. This surviving weapon bears two distinct gouges on its barrel from American return fire that knocked it out, but is otherwise intact.

Notes

References

Bibliography

External links 

 
 
 

World War I artillery of the United Kingdom
World War I guns
Naval guns of the United Kingdom
World War I naval weapons of the United Kingdom
152 mm artillery
Vickers
Coastal artillery